Hello Chapter 1: Hello, Stranger is the debut extended play by South Korean boy group CIX. It was released on July 23, 2019 by C9 Entertainment and distributed by Warner Music Korea. The EP consists of five tracks including the title track, "Movie Star".

Background and release 
On June 25, 2019, CIX released the debut date for their first EP album for July 23, and revealed the production line up through CIX's official Instagram page.

Promotion 
CIX first performed "Movie Star" on July 22, prior to their album release at Ulsan Kpop Festival Show. 

CIX had their debut showcase on July 24 at SK Handbball Stadium in Seoul Olympic Park.

Japanese version 
On October 23, 2019, CIX debuted in Japan with a Japanese version of their EP Hello Chapter 1: Hello, Stranger, including the song "My New World".

CIX held their Japanese debut showcase "Complete In X" at Line Cube Shibuya on November 10, and November 17 at Zepp Namba.

Track listing

Charts

Release history

Notes

References 

2019 debut EPs
CIX (band) albums
Korean-language EPs
2019 EPs